Zacatecas is a genus of moths of the family Crambidae. It contains only one species, Zacatecas ankasokellus, which is found in Madagascar.

References

Natural History Museum Lepidoptera genus database

Crambinae
Moths described in 1960
Taxa named by Pierre Viette